Ismail Fazil (born 26 May 1990), better known by his stage name Farhaan Fazil, is an Indian actor working in Malayalam cinema. He debuted in 2014 with Njan Steve Lopez directed by Rajeev Ravi. He is the younger son of filmmaker Fazil and brother of actor Fahadh Faasil.

Early life 

His elder brother Fahadh Faasil is an actor in Malayalam cinema. Nazriya Nazim is his sister-in-law.

Film career

Farhaan Faasil played the lead role in Rajeev Ravi's second directorial venture Njan Steve Lopez which was released in 2014. His next release was 2017 Romantic-Comedy film Basheerinte Premalekhanam directed by Aneesh Anwar.

Filmography

References

External links
 
 

Indian male film actors
Living people
1995 births
People from Alappuzha district
Male actors in Malayalam cinema